Katherine G. Farley is the Chair of Lincoln Center for the Performing Arts in New York City.  She is Senior Managing Director at Tishman Speyer.  In 2013, Crains New York Business listed her as number twelve among the “50 Most Powerful Women in New York”

Education

Farley graduated from Pembroke College in Brown University in 1971 with a BA in drawing, painting and sculpture.  She received her master's degree in Architecture (MARC) degree from Harvard School of Design in 1976.

Career

Farley began her career as an architect and project coordinator for Turner Construction Company International Division in New York City.

In 1984, she was hired by Jerry Speyer to head international development at Tishman Speyer.  Currently she is Senior Managing Director, Tishman Speyer, responsible for Brazil and China business and Global Corporate Marketing in New York City.

Volunteer

Lincoln Center
Farley has volunteered at Lincoln Center for the Performing Arts since 1999 when she joined the New York Philharmonic Board.  She served on the Lincoln Center Theater Board from 2003 to 2005.

In 2006–2010  she took on the Lincoln Center Redevelopment Project, which redesigned Lincoln Center. She served as chair-designate from 2009 to 2010 and, in 2011 became the Chair of Lincoln Center for the Performing Arts.

Board memberships
Farley is a member of the board of trustees of the Andrew W. Mellon Foundation and the Lang Lang International Music Foundation.  She has served on the Board of Trustees of Brown University and the Alvin Ailey American Dance Theater.

Personal
Farley married Jerry Speyer in 1991. They reside in New York City and have one daughter.

References

Living people
20th-century American architects
Harvard Graduate School of Design alumni
Lincoln Center
Pembroke College in Brown University alumni
Year of birth missing (living people)
21st-century American architects